Fairbanks Ranch is a census-designated place (CDP) in San Diego County, California. The population was 3,148 at the 2010 census, up from 2,244 at the 2000 census. The entire population is contained within two gated communities, divided into North and South sections by the formerly private San Dieguito Road.

The Fairbanks Ranch community borders Rancho Santa Fe to the northwest, the Rancho Santa Fe Farms gated community to the south and the Del Sur housing development of Black Mountain Ranch to the east.
The San Dieguito River and Lusardi Creek with the Lusardi Creek County Preserve lie to the north.

Geography
Fairbanks Ranch is located at  (32.995786, -117.183106).

Demographics

2010
At the 2010 census Fairbanks Ranch had a population of 3,148. The racial makeup of Fairbanks Ranch was 2,780 (88.3%) White, 24 (0.8%) African American, 7 (0.2%) Native American, 209 (6.6%) Asian, 4 (0.1%) Pacific Islander, 34 (1.1%) from other races, and 90 (2.9%) from two or more races. Hispanic or Latino of any race were 224 people (7.1%).

The whole population lived in households, no one lived in non-institutionalized group quarters and no one was institutionalized.

There were 1,099 households, 393 (35.8%) had children under the age of 18 living in them, 891 (81.1%) were opposite-sex married couples living together, 39 (3.5%) had a female householder with no husband present, 28 (2.5%) had a male householder with no wife present.  There were 22 (2.0%) unmarried opposite-sex partnerships, and 8 (0.7%) same-sex married couples or partnerships. 111 households (10.1%) were one person and 53 (4.8%) had someone living alone who was 65 or older. The average household size was 2.86.  There were 958 families (87.2% of households); the average family size was 3.04.

The age distribution was 759 people (24.1%) under the age of 18, 204 people (6.5%) aged 18 to 24, 378 people (12.0%) aged 25 to 44, 1,250 people (39.7%) aged 45 to 64, and 557 people (17.7%) who were 65 or older.  The median age was 49.4 years. For every 100 females, there were 94.7 males.  For every 100 females age 18 and over, there were 93.6 males.

There were 1,218 housing units at an average density of 239.8 per square mile, of the occupied units 1,030 (93.7%) were owner-occupied and 69 (6.3%) were rented. The homeowner vacancy rate was 2.1%; the rental vacancy rate was 4.1%.  2,945 people (93.6% of the population) lived in owner-occupied housing units and 203 people (6.4%) lived in rental housing units.

2000
At the 2000 census there were 2,244 people, 734 households, and 654 families in the CDP. The population density was 433.0 inhabitants per square mile (167.3/km). The racial makeup of the CDP was 91.35% White, 0.18% African American, 0.27% Native American, 5.61% Asian, 0.18% Pacific Islander, 0.67% from other races, and 1.74% from two or more races. Hispanic or Latino of any race were 3.57%.

Of the 734 households 43.9% had children under the age of 18 living with them, 85.3% were married couples living together, 2.2% had a female householder with no husband present, and 10.8% were non-families. 7.9% of households were one person and 2.6% were one person aged 65 or older.  The average household size was 3.06 and the average family size was 3.20.

The age distribution was 29.2% under the age of 18, 4.8% from 18 to 24, 18.9% from 25 to 44, 36.0% from 45 to 64, and 11.1% 65 or older.  The median age was 44 years. For every 100 females, there were 102.3 males.  For every 100 females age 18 and over, there were 99.7 males.

The median household income was in excess of $200,000, as is the median family income . Males had a median income of over $100,000 versus $36,591 for females. The per capita income for the CDP was $94,150.  About 3.4% of families and 3.0% of the population were below the poverty line, including 1.6% of those under age 18 and none of those age 65 or over.

Notable residents
Dinesh D'Souza, author
Douglas Fairbanks, actor, played "Zorro", and wife Mary Pickford, both founding members of United Artists
Trevor Hoffman, former Hall of Fame relief pitcher for the San Diego Padres
Joan Kroc, heiress to McDonald's fortune
Ted Leitner, radio talk show host and play-by-play announcer for the San Diego Padres
Mark Loretta, a former San Diego Padres player

References

External links

Census-designated places in San Diego County, California
North County (San Diego County)
Census-designated places in California
Gated communities in California